Meitei mythology or Manipuri mythology is a collection of myths, belonging to the religious and cultural traditions of the Meitei people, the predominant ethnic group of Manipur. It is associated with traditional Meitei religion (Sanamahism). Meitei myths are a part of Meitei culture (Manipuri culture) and explain various natural phenomena, how the human civilization developed, and the reasons of many things happening. Most of the Meitei legends are found in the Meitei language (Manipuri language) texts.

Textual sources 

Mythical narration plays an integral role in nearly every genre of Meitei literature (Manipuri literature). Some of the best known literary sources are:

Mythical beings 

Mythical beings include gods, goddesses, mythical creatures and many others.

References 

Asian mythology
Meitei mythology
Sino-Tibetan mythology